Patrik Nilsson (born 15 March 1982) is a Swedish bandy player, currently with Sandvikens AIK in the Swedish Elitserien.

Career
Nilsson started playing bandy at Söderfors GoIF but left to play in the top division at Sandvikens AIK. He has played for the Swedish national bandy team. All of his appearances have been while he was a Sandvikens AIK player. Nilsson was a member of the Sandvikens AIK squads that won the Swedish Championship in the 2001–02 and 2002–03 seasons and he was also a member of the Bandy World Cup winning squad in 2001–02 season.

He was the top scorer in the 2006–07 and the 2007–08 top division seasons with 70 and 94 goals respectively. On 26 February 2008, after scoring five goals in a playoff game against Motala, Nilsson set a milestone by exceeding 100 goals in one season.

After the great season with SAIK he went on playing in the Russian League for Kazan. After a season with trouble in Russia he returned to Sweden but this time to Hammarby IF Bandy. Nilsson signed a one-year contract with the club with an option for a second.

On 8 February 2022, he announced his retirement from bandy following the 2021–2022 season.

References

External links
 
 

1982 births
Living people
Swedish bandy players
Expatriate bandy players in Russia
Swedish expatriate sportspeople in Russia
Borlänge-Stora Tuna BK players
Dynamo Kazan players
Hammarby IF Bandy players
Zorky Krasnogorsk players
Sandvikens AIK players
Bollnäs GIF players
Sweden international bandy players
Bandy World Championship-winning players